Lydipta senicula is a species of beetle in the family Cerambycidae. It was described by Henry Walter Bates in 1865. It is known from Bolivia and Brazil.

References

Onciderini
Beetles described in 1865